Hubertus was a Christian saint and the first Bishop of Liège.

Hubertus may also refer to:

People

Royalty and nobility 
 Carl Gustaf Folke Hubertus (born 1946), King of Sweden
 Hubertus, Prince of Löwenstein-Wertheim-Freudenberg (1906–1984), German historian and political figure
 Prince Hubertus of Hohenlohe-Langenburg (born 1959), Mexican alpine skier
 Prince Hubertus of Prussia (1909–1950), third son of Crown Prince Wilhelm of Germany and Duchess Cecilie of Mecklenburg-Schwerin
 Prince Hubertus of Saxe-Coburg and Gotha (disambiguation)

Other 
Hubertus Antonius van der Aa (1935–2017), Dutch mycologist
Hubertus Albers (born 1965), German comedian
Hubertus von Amelunxen (born 1958), Swiss art historian
Hubertus C.M. Baargarst (1909–1985), Dutch boxer with the pseudonym Huub Huizenaar
Hubertus Bernardus “Huub” Bals (1937–1988), Dutch founder of the International Film Festival Rotterdam
Hubertus Bengsch (born 1952), German actor
Hubertus J.A. "Huub" Bertens (born 1960), Dutch bridge player
Hubertus Christiaan "Hubert" de Blanck (1856–1932), Dutch-born Cuban pianist and composer
Hubertus von Bonin (1911–1943), German World War II fighter ace
Hubertus Brandenburg (1923–2009), German Roman Catholic Bishop emeritus of Stockholm
Hubertus Czernin (1956–2006), Austrian investigative journalist
Hubertus Ernst (1917–2017), Dutch Roman Catholic Bishop
Hubertus-Maria Ritter von Heigl (1897–1985), German general during World War II
Hubertus Goltzius (1526–1583), Flemish painter, engraver, and printer
Hubertus Grimani (1562–1651), Dutch painter
Hubertus Heil (born 1972), German politician
Hubertus Hitschhold (1912–1966), German general during World War II
Hubertus Hoffmann (born 1955), German journalist, media manager and investor
Hubertus van Hove (1814–1865), Dutch painter 
Hubertus K.G. "Huub" Jansen (born 1962), Dutch cricket umpire
Hubertus Knabe (born 1959), German historian
Hubertus Lambriex (born 1960), Dutch sailor
Hubertus Lamey (1896–1981), German general during World War II
Hubertus Johannes van Mook (1894–1965), Dutch administrator in the East Indies
Hubertus M. Mühlhäuser (born 1969), German businessman
Hubertus Naich (c.1513–c.1546), Flemish composer active in Rome
Hubertus G.J.H. "Huub" Oosterhuis (born 1933), Dutch theologian and poet
Hubertus von Pilgrim (born 1931), German sculptor, printmaker, and medallist
Hubertus Primus (born 1955), German lawyer, journalist and manager
Hubertus Quellinus (1619–1687), Flemish printmaker, draughtsman and painter
Hubertus Regout (born 1969), Belgian-born German actor
Hubertus Reulandt (1590–1661), Luxembourgish printer
Hubertus "Huub" Rothengatter (born 1954), Dutch racing driver
Hubertus Schmidt (born 1959), German equestrian
Hubertus W.J.M. "Huub" Stapel (born 1954), Dutch actor
Hubertus K.G. "Huub" Stevens (born 1953), Dutch football player and manager
Hubertus Strughold (1898–1986), German-born American physiologist and Nazi physician
Hubertus van der Vaart (born 1955), Dutch American businessman
Hubertus Zilverberg (born 1939), Dutch road bicycle racer

Fictional characters 
 Hubertus Bigend, a character in the novel Pattern Recognition

Other
 Hubertus, Wisconsin, United States
 International Order of St. Hubertus, knightly hunting organization
 Subaru Legacy Hubertus 2, a trim level offered on the German-spec Subaru Legacy wagon starting in 1992
Hubertus Spring, spring in the Harz Mountains in Germany

Dutch masculine given names
German masculine given names
Latin masculine given names